The Lakeland Pilots were a Florida International League (1946–1950, 1952) and Florida State League (1953-1955) baseball team based in Lakeland, Florida, United States. They played their home games at Henley Field.

In 1954, they won their sole league championship, under the guidance of managers James Bello and Rip Sewell.

Notable alumni

 Luke Hamlin (1949)

 Roy Hughes (1951)

 Rip Sewell (1954)

References

Baseball teams established in 1946
Defunct minor league baseball teams
Defunct Florida State League teams
Sports in Lakeland, Florida
Defunct baseball teams in Florida
1946 establishments in Florida
1955 disestablishments in Florida
Baseball teams disestablished in 1955